Gharq Ab Zar (also Romanized as Gharq Āb Zār and Gharqāb Zār) is a village in Balaband Rural District, in the Central District of Fariman County, Razavi Khorasan Province, Iran. At the 2006 census, its population was 52, in 12 families.

References 

Populated places in Fariman County